Luquetia orientella is a moth of the family Depressariidae. It is found in Greece, North Macedonia, Albania and Russia.

The wingspan is 20–22 mm.

References

Moths described in 1893
Depressariinae
Moths of Europe